The pink-footed shearwater (Ardenna creatopus) is a species of seabird. It is polymorphic, having both darker- and lighter-phase populations. Together with the equally light-billed flesh-footed shearwater, it forms the Hemipuffinus group, a superspecies that may or may not have an Atlantic relative in the great shearwater. These are large shearwaters which are among those that could be separated in the genus Ardenna.

A molecular phylogenetic study published in 2021 found very little genetic difference between the pink-footed shearwater and the flesh-footed shearwater (Ardenna carneipes). The authors of the study suggested that these two taxa might be better considered as conspecific.

This species is pelagic, occurring in the Pacific Ocean. It predominantly nests on offshore islands off Chile, i.e. Mocha Island. It is a transequatorial migrant, moving toward subarctic waters of the Pacific after raising its young. It is fairly common well off the West Coast of the United States during the country's warmer months.

The pink-footed shearwater feeds on mainly fish, squid, and crustaceans.

This bird nests in burrows, preferring forested slopes. It is a colonial nester.

Numbers of this shearwater have been reduced due to predation by introduced species, such as rats and cats. Some loss of birds also occurs from becoming entangled in fishing gear. The pink-footed shearwater is one of the species to which the Agreement on the Conservation of Albatrosses and Petrels applies.

References

Further reading
Carboneras, Carles (1992): 54. Pink-footed Shearwater. In: del Hoyo, Josep; Elliott, Andrew & Sargatal, Jordi (editors): Handbook of Birds of the World, Volume 1: Ostrich to Ducks: 253, Plate 16. Lynx Edicions, Barcelona. 
Harrison, Peter (1991): Seabirds: An Identification Guide. Houghton Mifflin.
National Geographic Society (2002): Field Guide to the Birds of North America. National Geographic, Washington DC.

External links
Pink-footed shearwater photos
BirdLife species factsheet

pink-footed shearwater
Birds of the Americas
Western North American coastal fauna
Western South American coastal birds
pink-footed shearwater